Rezwan Shahriar Sumit is a Bangladeshi filmmaker. He won Bangladesh National Film Award for Best Film and  Best Director for his debut film Nonajoler Kabbo (2021).

Background
Sumit studied filmmaking at New York University Tisch School of the Arts.

References

External links

Living people
Tisch School of the Arts alumni
Bangladeshi film directors
Best Director National Film Award (Bangladesh) winners
Place of birth missing (living people)
Date of birth missing (living people)
Year of birth missing (living people)